So Far... The Best Of is a greatest hits album released by Irish singer Sinéad O'Connor in 1997. The collection features songs appearing on O'Connor's first four studio albums, along with several non-album collaborations. "Heroine" and "Empire" are also included on O'Connor's 2005 compilation album Collaborations. The album was her last album with Chrysalis Records, as she later moved to Atlantic Records in 1998.

Track listings

North American
 "Nothing Compares 2 U" (Prince)
 "Mandinka" (O'Connor)
 "The Emperor's New Clothes" (O'Connor)
 "The Last Day of Our Acquaintance" (O'Connor)
 "Fire on Babylon" (O'Connor, John Reynolds)
 "Troy" (O'Connor)
 "I Am Stretched on Your Grave" (Traditional, arranged by O'Connor)
 "Success Has Made a Failure of Our Home" (Mullins, O'Connor)
 "John, I Love You" (O'Connor)
 "Empire" (Bomb the Bass featuring Benjamin Zephaniah and Sinéad O'Connor) (Tim Simenon, O'Connor, Zephaniah)
 "I Want Your (Hands on Me)" (O'Connor, Reynolds, Dean, Clowes, Holifield)
 "Heroine" (The Edge featuring Sinéad O'Connor & Larry Mullen Jr.) (The Edge, Brook, O'Connor)
 "Don't Cry for Me, Argentina" (Tim Rice, Andrew Lloyd Webber)
 "You Made Me the Thief of Your Heart" (Bono, Gavin Friday, Maurice Seezer)
 "Just Like U Said It Would B" (O'Connor)

International
 "Nothing Compares 2 U" (Prince)
 "Mandinka" (O'Connor)
 "The Emperor's New Clothes" (O'Connor)
 "Thank You for Hearing Me" (O'Connor, Reynolds)
 "The Last Day of Our Acquaintance" (O'Connor)
 "Fire on Babylon" (O'Connor, Reynolds)
 "Troy" (O'Connor)
 "I Am Stretched on Your Grave" (Traditional, arranged by O'Connor)
 "Jackie" (O'Connor)
 "Success Has Made a Failure of Our Home" (Mullins, O'Connor)
 "John I Love You" (O'Connor)
 "Empire" (Bomb the Bass featuring Benjamin Zephaniah and Sinéad O'Connor) (Simeon, O'Connor, Zephaniah)
 "Don't Cry for Me, Argentina" (Tim Rice, Andrew Lloyd Webber)
 "You Made Me the Thief of Your Heart" (Bono, Friday, Seezer)
 "This Is A Rebel Song" (O'Connor)

Certifications and Sales

References

1997 greatest hits albums
Sinéad O'Connor albums
Chrysalis Records compilation albums
Albums produced by John Reynolds (musician)